A list of current and past contributors to The New Yorker, along with the dates they were published and their primary areas of interest.

A

B–Bi

Bl–By

C

D–E

F

G

H

I–J

K

L

M–Mc

Me–Mz

N–O

P–Q

R

Sa–Sh

Si–Sz

T–V

W–Z

Notes

Further reading 

 The Complete Book of Covers from The New Yorker, 1925–1989 (1989). New York: Alfred A. Knopf. ISBN 0-394-57841-4

External links
 The New Yorker Contributors

List